{{Infobox beauty pageant
| photo = File:Miss_USA_1995_opening_titles.jpg
| winner = Chelsi Smith Texas| date = February 10, 1995
| presenters =
| venue = South Padre Island, Texas
| broadcaster = CBS, KGBT-TV
| congeniality = Chelsi Smith Texas
| photogenic = Nichole Holmes Illinois
| before = 1994
| next = 1996
}}Miss USA 1995 was the 44th Miss USA pageant, held at South Padre Island Convention Centre on South Padre Island, Texas culminating in the final competition and crowning on February 10, 1995.

At the conclusion of the final competition, Chelsi Smith of Texas was crowned by outgoing titleholder Lu Parker of South Carolina. Smith became the seventh Texan titleholder, the first Miss Texas USA and Miss USA to win the Congeniality award, and until R'Bonney Gabriel in 2022, was also the only Miss USA from Texas to win the Miss Universe title. She also became the 4th winner to be crowned as Miss USA in her home state.

After Smith won the 1995 Miss Universe pageant, first runner-up Shanna Moakler took over the Miss USA title.  Moakler was the first former Miss Teen USA delegate to hold the Miss USA title. Moakler would later become an actress, reality star and a director of two Miss USA state pageants in Nevada and Utah.

The pageant was held on South Padre Island, Texas for the second time.  It was hosted by Bob Goen for the second consecutive year, and Daisy Fuentes offered commentary during the broadcast.  Barry Manilow provided entertainment.

Results

Placements∞ Smith won Miss Universe 1995. Due to protocol, Smith resigns her title as Miss USA 1995. 1st runner-up, Shanna Moakler, replaces her as Miss USA.
Miss Congenality - Chelsi Smith (Texas) 
Miss Photogenic - Nichole Holmes (Illinois)
Style Award - Lynn Vesnefski (Hawaii)
Best in Swimsuit - Chelsi Smith (Texas)

 Historical significance 
 Texas wins competition for the seventh time.
 New York earns the 1st runner-up position for the sixth time. The last time it placed this was in 1974. Also became the third woman from New York to win the Miss USA title. She finished as 1st runner-up, but succeeded as Miss USA 1995 after Chelsi Smith won Miss Universe.
 Illinois earns the 2nd runner-up position for the second time. The last time it placed this was in 1985.
 Florida finishes as Top 6 for the first time and reaches its highest placement since 1988.
 Minnesota finishes as Top 6 for the first time and reaches its highest placement since 1985.
 Louisiana finishes as Top 6 for the second time and repeats the same placement as the last year 1994.
 States that placed in semifinals the previous year were Illinois, Louisiana, Minnesota, Missouri, New York and Texas.
 Texas placed for the fourth consecutive year.
 New York placed for the third consecutive year. 
 Illinois, Louisiana, Minnesota and Missouri made their second consecutive placement. 
 Kentucky last placed in 1992.
 Oklahoma last placed in 1991.
 Florida and Maryland last placed in 1988.
 Massachusetts last placed in 1985.
 Rhode Island last placed in 1973.
 Hawaii and Tennessee break an ongoing streak of placements since 1993.
 South Carolina breaks an ongoing streak of placements since 1992.
 Kansas breaks an ongoing streak of placements since 1991.

Scores

Preliminary competition

The following are the contestants' scores in the preliminary competition:

 Winner
 First runner-up
 Second runner-up 
 Top 6 Finalist 
 Top 12 Semifinalist 

Final competition

 Winner
 First runner-up
 Second runner-up 
 Top 6 Finalist

Delegates

The Miss USA 1995 delegates were:

 Alabama – Anna Mingus
 Alaska – Theresa Lindley
 Arizona – Shara Riggs
 Arkansas – Kristen Bettis
 California – Deana Avila
 Colorado – Emily Weeks
 Connecticut – Traci Bryant
 Delaware – Nicole Garis
 District of Columbia – Marci Andrews
 Florida – Shannon Depuy
 Georgia – Paulette Schier
 Hawaii – Lynn Vesnefski
 Idaho – Amy Tolzmann
 Illinois – Nichole Holmes
 Indiana – Heather Hart
 Iowa – Angela Hearne
 Kansas – Deborah Daulton
 Kentucky – Mitzi Jones
 Louisiana – Elizabeth Coxe
 Maine – Kerri Malinowski
 Maryland – Jennifer Wilhoit
 Massachusetts – Kristen Mastroianni
 Michigan – Keisha Eichelberger
 Minnesota – Angelique de Maison
 Mississippi – Jill Tullos
 Missouri – Britt Powell
 Montana – Angela Janich
 Nebraska – Chandelle Peacock
 Nevada – Brook Hammond
 New Hampshire – Valerie Gosselin
 New Jersey – Christy Pittner
 New Mexico – Jacqueline Grice
 New York – Shanna Moakler North Carolina – Michelle Mauney
 North Dakota – Jean Stallmo
 Ohio – Julia Hughes
 Oklahoma – Du Sharme Carter
 Oregon – Karrie Grove
 Pennsylvania – Stephanie Fallat
 Rhode Island – Jennifer Aubin
 South Carolina – Danielle Corley
 South Dakota – Jenny Shobeck
 Tennessee – Lee Ann Huey
 Texas – Chelsi Smith Utah – Melanie Mitton
 Vermont – Jennifer Cazeault
 Virginia – Susan Robinson
 Washington – Theresa Cox
 West Virginia – Tracy Holcomb
 Wisconsin – Tanae Geisler
 Wyoming''' – Susan Shaffer

Previous title holders

Delegates who had previously held a Miss America state title were:
Shannon Depuy (Florida) - Miss Virginia 1990 (Top 10 semifinalist at Miss America 1991)
Du Sharme Carter (Oklahoma) - Miss Oklahoma 1992 (4th runner-up at Miss America 1993)

Delegates who had previously held a Miss Teen USA state title were:
Shanna Moakler (New York) - Miss Rhode Island Teen USA 1992 (Top 12 semifinalist at Miss Teen USA 1992)
Jennifer Wilhoit (Maryland) - Miss Maryland Teen USA 1991
Kristen Mastroianni (Massachusetts) - Miss Massachusetts Teen USA 1987 (Top 10 semifinalist at Miss Teen USA 1987)
Heather Hart (Indiana) - Miss Indiana Teen USA 1991 (Top 12 semifinalist at Miss Teen USA 1991)
Brooke Hammond (Nevada) - Miss Nevada Teen USA 1991
Anna Mingus (Alabama) - Miss Alabama Teen USA 1988 (4th runner-up at Miss Teen USA 1988)
Keri Mowenowski (Maine) - Miss Maine Teen USA 1991
Tanae Geisler (Wisconsin) - Miss Wisconsin Teen USA 1993

Judges

Joyce Brothers
Casey Kasem
K Callan
Peter Barton
Kiki Shepard
Chris Kole
Jackie Loughery - Miss USA 1952 from New York
E. G. Marshall
Mary McFadden
Jim Jeffcoat

See also
Miss Universe 1995

References

External links
Miss USA official website

1995
February 1995 events in the United States
1995 beauty pageants
1995 in Texas